Lawrence Adegbeingbe (born 17 March 1957) is a Nigerian former sprinter who competed in the 1984 Summer Olympics.

References

1957 births
Living people
Yoruba sportspeople
Nigerian male sprinters
Olympic athletes of Nigeria
Athletes (track and field) at the 1984 Summer Olympics
Athletes (track and field) at the 1982 Commonwealth Games
Commonwealth Games gold medallists for Nigeria
Commonwealth Games medallists in athletics
20th-century Nigerian people
Medallists at the 1982 Commonwealth Games